The Fuling Yangtze River Bridge  is a cable-stayed bridge over the Yangtze River in Fuling District of Chongqing, China. Completed in 1997, it was the first bridge over the Yangtze in the Fuling district.

References

See also
Yangtze River bridges and tunnels

Bridges in Chongqing
Bridges over the Yangtze River
Cable-stayed bridges in China
Bridges completed in 1997